Bering Strait School District (BSSD) is a school district in northwestern Alaska, United States, serving approximately 1,700 students in grades K-12 in fifteen isolated villages.  All schools in the district serve students of all ages, and most classrooms are multi-age.

The district headquarters are in Unalakleet, Alaska.

Communities
The student population is roughly 98% Alaska Native, including Yup'ik, Siberian Yup'ik, and Inupiat Eskimos.

The communities in the district are traditional Eskimo villages which rely on subsistence activities such as hunting marine mammals and migratory birds, and gathering berries. Native dance and traditional crafts such as walrus ivory carving are still strong. At least four villages practice traditional whaling. There are few cash economy jobs, and the school is often the largest employer in each village.

Russia is visible from four district schools with the naked eye, most notably from Diomede School located on the island of Little Diomede, where it is only 2.4 km (1.5 mi) from the International Date Line.

The route of the Iditarod Trail Sled Dog Race runs through six district villages, where it is a major event. Many current and former Iditarod mushers live in the district, and participate in school activities focusing on the history and cultural traditions of mushing.

Mission statement
"Achieving excellence by nurturing the whole student in a culturally based learning community that is safe and supportive"

Vision statement
"All students are thriving and contributing culturally ~ locally ~ globally"

Schools 

 Anthony A. Andrews School (St. Michael)
 Aniguiin School (Elim)
 Brevig Mission School (Brevig Mission)
 Diomede School (Diomede)
 John Apangalook School (Gambell)
 Hogarth Kingeekuk, Sr. Memorial School (Savoonga)
 James C. Isabell School (Teller)
 Koyuk-Malimiut School (Koyuk)
 Martin L. Olson School (Golovin)
 Paul F. Asicksik School (Shaktoolik)
 Shishmaref School (Shishmaref)
 Tukurngailnguq School (Stebbins)
 Unalakleet Schools (Unalakleet)
 Wales Kingikmiut School (Wales)
 White Mountain School (White Mountain)

References

External links
Bering Strait School District
BSSD OpenContent Initiative

School districts in Alaska
Nome Census Area, Alaska
Education in Unorganized Borough, Alaska